Milton William Cline (May 16, 1825 in Whitehall, New York – October 7, 1911 in Montrose County, Colorado) was a 19th-century American sailor, soldier, scout and pioneer.  His name appears throughout the history of the United States Civil War and post-bellum period.

Cline began his career as a sailor aboard the whaling ship SS South Carolina in 1846.

Military career

Prior to the US Civil War, Cline moved to Indiana, and during the War, he served as a scout with the 3rd Regiment Indiana Cavalry.  Under the command of Major General Joseph Hooker,and, Major General George H Sharp Cline was assigned to a newly formed core of scouts, where he rose to chief scout. One especially daring BMI scout, Sgt. Milton W. Cline, managed to attach himself to a Confederate cavalry captain and rode the entire length of Lee's lines a few days before the Battle of Chancellorsville. Sharpe requested that Federal military authorities send him for tens of thousands of dollars in captured Confederate currency, for him to give to his military scouts and civilian spies to use. Cline's success with this group was mixed.(He was often called upon for the most daring missions)   On the one hand, he accomplished "the deepest and longest infiltration of the Confederation Army recorded during the war,", and was instrumental in obtaining key intelligence about orders being sent by Jefferson Davis, but on the other hand, he was later blamed for the failure of an infiltration mission ( The Kilpatrick-Dahlgren Raid (February 28–March 3, 1864) in which all but one of the infiltrators was killed or captured.  Cline along with the rest of the 3rd Indiana Calvery were mustered out of the Union CIvil War ranks in August 1864.

After the Civil war Cline moved west. Historical records list Cline as one of the first prospectors and "founding" settlers of the town of Ouray Colorado. In addition to being an early prospector of Colorado Captain Milton W Cline is listed as Ouray's first postmaster, mayor and Sheriff  of Cimmerian. (Gunnison Daily Review Press notes that an election that was held to choose Cimarron's town officers declared Captain Cline "chosen marshal and appointed deputy sheriff."22). After several years of prospecting and owning mines such as "The Mickey Breen" and "Mother Cline Slide" Capt. Cline ultimately settling his home in Cimarron, Colorado and became a cattle rancher, at its peak, his ranch covered  and had 5400 head of cattle.

Cline had a close relationship with Chief Ouray and the Ute people who neighbored his range.  He was known to intervene in local disputes between the Utes and the white settlers, specifically during the hostage crisis following the Meeker Massacre, when Cline was among the party sent by the US government to negotiate the release of hostages taken by the Utes.

Cline, was again involved in an alarming incident when, several Utes tribe members went into a freighters camp on Blue Mountain Mesa on September 29. 1880 asking for food. They were refused. As the tribe members left, a young freighter named A. D. Jackson, shot and killed Johnson Shavano, the son of Chief Shavano. The freighters quickly moved their camp to the Cline ranch where some troops were camping. 60 Utes assemble by Shavano, intercepted Cline and his military escort while taking A D Jackson to Gunnison to stand trial. A D Jackson was killed by the vigilantly assembled by Chief Shavano. Cline was later himself arrested over the incident and eventually cleared of wrong doing.

Death
Cline died on October 7, 1911, in Montrose County, Colorado.  At the time, the Ouray County Plaindealer noted his death as "A famous old pioneer dead."

References

People of Indiana in the American Civil War
1825 births
1911 deaths
People from Whitehall, New York
People from Montrose County, Colorado